Irma Libohova (born 14 April 1959) is an Albanian singer and songwriter.

Life and career 

Libohova was born in Tirana in a family originating from Lushnje. She debuted in the Albanian National Festival in December 1978. Libohova became known in the 1980s due to her singing style full of energy and powerful voice. 
During her career, she has won several prizes, some of them in the National Festival such as 1983 with "Zgjodha njeriun" (I chose the person), 1987 "Nuk e harroj" (I don't forget it) - winner of the 26th edition, 1988 with "Dy shoqe ne dhe duhemi si motra" (Two friends and lobe each other like sisters), 1991 with "Horoskopi" (Horoscope), 1996 with "Gjethet e shtatorit" (September leaves),  and other recent competitions as Kënga Magjike of 2000 with "1001 ëndrra" (1001 dreams), 2004 with "Prapë tek ti do vij" (I will come back to you) (2004), etc. She is the older sister of Albanian singer Eranda Libohova.

References

1959 births
Living people
Musicians from Tirana
20th-century Albanian women singers
21st-century Albanian women singers
Festivali i Këngës winners